Valeriy Syrov (1 September 1946 – 28 August 2019) was a Ukrainian Soviet-era professional football player who played as defender and after his retirement worked as a football manager.

Playing and coaching career
Syrov began to play football only at the age of 19 and the main part of his career was spent in the Western Ukraine club Karpaty Lviv. In 1969 he participated in the team victory in the Soviet Cup competition where in the final at Luzhniki Stadium they beat Rostov Army team.

After his retirement he worked as an assistant manager in the different football clubs.

He died in Mykolaiv on 28 August 2019.

Honours
 Soviet Cup winner: 1969.

References

External links
 

1946 births
2019 deaths
Sportspeople from Novosibirsk
Soviet footballers
Ukrainian footballers
FC Zenit Saint Petersburg players
SC Lutsk players
FC Karpaty Lviv players
FC Metalurh Zaporizhzhia players
Miedź Legnica players
Association football defenders
Expatriate footballers in Poland
Soviet football managers
Ukrainian football managers